Mihály Kovács (18 July 18183 August 1892) was a Hungarian painter.

Kovács was born in Abádszalók and died in Budapest. Several of his paintings can be found in the Hungarian National Gallery, including the Palatine Garay defends Queens Mary and Elizabeth (cca 1885).

References

1818 births
1892 deaths
19th-century Hungarian painters
Hungarian male painters
19th-century Hungarian male artists